Nastanthus is a genus of flowering plants in the family Calyceraceae. It has been proposed to synonymize Nastanthus within the genus Gamocarpha.

Species
Species include:
 Nastanthus falklandicus D.M.Moore
 Nastanthus agglomeratus
 Nastanthus patagonicus
 Nastanthus spathulatus

References

Calyceraceae
Asterales genera
Taxonomy articles created by Polbot